Ana Faez (born 14 June 1972) is a Cuban fencer. She competed in the women's individual sabre event at the 2004 Summer Olympics.

References

External links
 

1972 births
Living people
Cuban female sabre fencers
Olympic fencers of Cuba
Fencers at the 2004 Summer Olympics
Pan American Games medalists in fencing
Pan American Games gold medalists for Cuba
Pan American Games bronze medalists for Cuba
Fencers at the 2003 Pan American Games
Medalists at the 2003 Pan American Games
20th-century Cuban women
20th-century Cuban people
21st-century Cuban women